Juana Manuela Gorriti (July 15, 1818 – November 6, 1892) was an Argentine writer with extensive political and literary links to Bolivia and Peru. She held the position of First Lady of Bolivia from 1848 to 1855.

With the publication of La quena (1845), Gorriti became recognized as the earliest novelist in what would become Argentina. In La quena, Gorriti challenged the notion of poverty, ignorance, tyranny, and the oppression of women, writing, "A day shall come in which man's science will discover those treasures; but by then men will be free and equal, and they shall use wealth to serve humanity! The reign of worries and despotism will have ended, and only man's genius will rule the world, it reside upon the head of a European, or upon that of an Indian." Gorriti’s commitment to women’s issues sparked the interest of both women and men, including Abel Delgado.  His essay, ‘La educación social de la mujer’, ("The Social Education of Woman," 1892) discussed male and female spheres and justified women's participation in law and politics.

Biography
Juana Manuela Gorriti was born in Rosario de la Frontera, in the province of Salta, in the north of Argentina. She came from a wealthy upper-class family and attended a convent school when she was eight. She was born to José Ignacio Gorriti and Feleciana Zuviria. Her father, José Ignacio de Gorriti, was a politician and soldier, and signed the Argentine Declaration of Independence on July 9, 1816. She was also the niece of the infamous guerrilla Jose Francisco "Pachi" Gorriti. Her family was liberal, and supported the Unitarians during a time when Juan Manuel de Rosas ran the country. De Rosas was a conservative Governor of Buenos Aires Province from 1829 to 1832 who used promoted violent measures to dispossess indigenous people and pave the way for expansion. In 1831, when Gorriti was thirteen, the federal caudillo Facundo Quiroga forced Gorriti and much of her family into exile.

Goritti's family settled in Tarija, Bolivia, where she met her future husband, Manuel Isidro Belzú, who was a captain in the Bolivian Army at the time. They married when she was fifteen, and they had three daughters. As his career advanced, their marriage suffered, and he abandoned her in 1842 after nine years together. Gorriti did not receive the divorce papers until fourteen years later, after his assassination. After her return to Argentina she died November 6, 1892, in Buenos Aires, Argentina at the age of 74.

The Salons 
In Lima, the coastal city where she lived, she developed a name as an influential journalist and started to host tertulias on a regular basis. These salons would be attended by fashionable and mostly well-educated men and women, such as Ricardo Palma and Manuel González Prada, Mercedes Cabello de Carbonera, Clorinda Matto de Turner and Teresa González de Fanning. They would meet to discuss literature and social progress, themes that Gorriti felt passionate about and would include in much of her literature.

By organizing and hosting her tertulias, Gorriti provided a great opportunity for female writers to come together and discuss literature, progress, and the progress of women. Many of the attendees would later go on to write more about these subjects, including Teresa González de Fanning, who founded an enlightened women's movement.

Women's Rights 
Gorriti was an ardent feminist before the term itself was invented, and her dedication to women’s rights showed in many of her journals. Through her writings, she instructed and inspired women to take on the gender roles more commonly found in Europe and North America. She wanted women to be heard, to educate themselves, and to not be afraid to go against social norms.

First Lady of Bolivia 
Manuel Isidoro Belzú, husband to Gorriti, went on to become president of Boliva in 1848. He survived an assassination attempt two years later and ruled for a further five years until retiring in 1855, having sponsored his son-in-law, Jorge Córdova, to succeed him. Jorge Córdova was overthrown in a coup d’état two years later and was succeeded by José María Linares, who in turn was ousted by his Minister of War, José María de Achá in 1861. Achá survived for three years until replaced, through another coup, by General Mariano Melgarejo. Belzú raised an army against Melgarejo who, according to unconfirmed rumours, invited him to the presidential palace and shot him during a fake embrace. He died on 23 March 1865.

Battlefield Nurse 
In 1866, the Spanish Navy shelled ports on Peru's and Chile's coastlines, including the port of Lima, where Gorriti served as a battlefield nurse. Gorriti received a military honor from Peru for her heroic acts of saving injured Peruvian soldiers. She also risked her life evacuating the wounded when the Spanish surrendered at Callao. For her heroism, and Florence Nightingale-like actions, Gorriti was seen as a Peruvian freedom fighter and was awarded the Second Star of May by the Peruvian government. She wrote about these events in numerous articles and short stories, later collected and published in the Album of Lima founded by herself and her friend and fellow writer Carolina Freyre de Jaimes.

Return to Argentina 
In 1878, Gorriti returned to Argentina. Even after having faced numerous scandals in her life such as divorce, exile, and Belzu having a child out of wedlock, she was still seen as an exceptional woman who brought great pride to her country. Gorriti became a mother to two daughters, Edelmira Belzu and Mercedes Belzu de Dorado. Her daughter Mercedes became sick in Peru in 1879, but Gorriti could not go to her because of the war between Chile and Peru over the provinces of Tanca and Arica. Mercedes died later that year. Gorriti also founded the newspaper The Argentina Dawn, in which she published many articles on the rights and education of women. When she died, Argentines hailed her as a famous, instructive, influential journalist in her day.

Literary Contributions 
Gorriti left Bolivia for Peru, where her literary life would take off. When she initially arrived in Peru she had no financial support or resources. Gorriti founded an all girls school in Bolivia, where she dedicated her life to teaching and writing. She was an ardent feminist, and it showed in many of her journals. Gorriti wrote several short novels and numerous short stories. Her novels include El Pozo de Yocci (The Yocci Well), a love story, ghost story and Gothic horror rolled into one, set in one of the most critical periods in the history of the Argentine Republic, contrasting the idealistic patriotism behind the War of Independence with the savagery of the civil wars that followed. This was followed by La oasis de la vida (The Oasis of Life), a melodramatic novel written in the 1880s. La tierra natal (The Native Land), her last major work, published in 1889, relates a physical journey through northern Argentina, back to the places where she had lived over the course of her lifetime, as well as a voyage back through her memories of the people and events she had known and experienced along the way. Two of her most famous short stories are La hija del mazorquero and El lucero de manantial; both are melodramatic tales with a strong anti-Rosista political message. Gorriti also founded the newspaper The Dawn of Argentina (La Alborada Argentina) with fellow poet Numa Pompilio Yona.

Her intermittent three-year stay in Lima resulted in the publication of La Quena, a short but influential novella, in the prestigious newspaper El Comercio. Later, as Peruvian politics began to stabilize, she contributed to the Revista de Limawith stories like El Angel Caido and Si haces mal no esperes bien.

Gorriti's stories are finely crafted and bear witness to trends in South American literature of the 19th century.

Principal works

Novels
 El pozo de Yocci (1869) 
 Oasis en la Vida (1888)  
 La tierra natal (1889)

Novellas, short stories, and miscellaneous writings
 Sueños y realidades (1865)
 Panoramas de la vida (1876)
 Misceláneas (1878)
 El mundo de los recuerdos (1886)

English translations of her work
 Dreams and Realities translated by Sergio Waisman
 The Yocci Well translated by Kathryn Phillips-Miles
 Our Native Land translated by Kathryn Phillips-Miles

References

External links
Berg, Mary. "Juana Manuela Gorriti: narradora de su epoca" Loyola University Maryland, 20 March 2007. 18 March 2007
Sylvester, Santiago. "Exile and property." Iruya. 8 March 1997. 17 March 2007
Fernandez, Maria Cristina.  "Franciscano Military man."  Portal Informativo de SALTA. 3 March 2007. 17 March 2007
Ward, Thomas. "Ficción histórica peruana: Las escritoras comprometidas". Labrys: études féministes/estudos feministas, No. 11 "Femenismos en el Perú" (janvier/juin 2007-janeiro/junho 2007).
 

1818 births
1896 deaths
19th-century Argentine women writers
19th-century Argentine writers
19th-century Peruvian women writers
19th-century Peruvian writers
Argentine feminists
First ladies and gentlemen of Bolivia
People from Salta